Custodial deaths in India may refer to the deaths of persons in police custody and also to the deaths of persons in judicial custody while undergoing trail or serving a sentence. In the financial year 2021–22, the National Human Rights Commission of India reported 2152 deaths had occurred in judicial custody and 155 deaths had occurred in police custody till 28 February 2022. According to a report released by National Campaign Against Torture (NCAT), there were 1606 deaths in 2019 which occurred in judicial custody and 125 death occurred in police custody. On 26 July 2022, while answering a question in the Lok Sabha Union Minister of State for Home Affairs Nityanand Rai revealed that 4484 cases of custodial deaths were reported in India during the period FY 2020-21 to FY 2021-22

In 1997, India signed the United Nations Convention against Torture. As of April 2022, India is yet to ratify it.

Legal aspects

Statutory protections

 Article 20 (3) of the Indian Constitution protects the citizens from self incrimination.
 Articles 24 and 25 of the Indian Evidence Act, 1872 renders forced confessions and confessions made to the police irrelevant in trials.
 Section 176 (I) of the Code of Criminal Procedure (CrPC) states that if a person in custody dies or disappears, or a woman is raped in custody, the Judicial Magistrate has the power to order an inquiry.
 Section 46 of the Code of Criminal Procedure (CrPC) states the police cannot kill anyone while performing an arrest.
 Section 49 of the Code of Criminal Procedure (CrPC) states the police cannot used excessive restraints while performing an arrest.
 Section 54 of the Code of Criminal Procedure (CrPC) allows the Magistrate to appoint a medical petitioner to examine the accused under-trials.
 Sections 330 (a) and (b) of the Indian Penal Code (IPC) allow sentences of up to 7 years for policemen in cases of torture.

Ongoing and proposed reforms
On 18 December 1996, the Supreme Court of India gave the verdict in D. K. Basu vs. State of West Bengal. The Public Interest Litigation (PIL) had started as a result of a letter sent by D. K. Basu, a former Calcutta High Court judge and then executive chairman of Legal Aid Services of West Bengal, to the Chief Justice of India (CJI) on 26 August 1986. The letter requested the CJI to examine the issue of frequent custodial deaths, form guidelines to be followed during arrest and formulate compensation to be provided to the victims/families in case of custodial torture or death. In the 1996 verdict, the court suggested 11 guidelines which covered arresting procedures and compensation in case of death of the detainee.

The 2008 amendment to the Code of Criminal Procedure incorporated some of the suggestions of the Supreme Court of India given in its 1996 verdict. The clauses under the amendment stated that for crimes punishable with prison up to 7 years, the dealing officer should issue a "notice of appearance" instead of arresting the accused. The officer may however arrest the accused if he fails to comply with the notice.

On 6 May 2010, the Lok Sabha passed the Prevention of Torture Bill, 2010. However, the Rajya Sabha referred the bill to a select committee as it was felt that the bill was not up to the standards of the United Nations Convention against Torture. The revised bill lapsed when the 15th Lok Sabha was dissolved on 18 May 2014.

In 2018, the Law Commission of India suggested in a report that India should ratify the United Nations Convention against Torture and pass a standalone law against torture of citizens by government agents. The report pointed out that India was facing difficulties in extraditing criminals from other nations dues its reputation of custodial torture.

State-wise custodial deaths

Notable cases
 1 March 1976: The custodial death P. Rajan. An engineering student named P. Rajan was arrested by Calicut police during the Emergency on 1 March 1976. His father filed a writ petition in the Kerala High Court and the court issued a habeas corpus. The police failed to produced P. Rajan on the stipulated date 21 April 1976. He is presumed dead.
 2 December 1987: The custodial death of Suman Behera. The police arrested Suman Behera of Sundergarh, Orissa on 1 December 1987. The dead body of Suman Behera was found on nearby train tracks on 2 December 1987. The mother of the victim, Nilabati Behera, sued the state of Orissa.
 27 September 2005: The custodial death of Udayakumar. Three Thiruvananthapuram policemen had arrested Udayakumar on suspicion of theft and then killed him. On 23 July 2018, a Central Bureau of Investigation (CBI) special court found two of the officers guilty and sentenced them to death. One of the accused policemen died during the trial.
 21 June 2019: The custodial death of K. Rajkumar. A 49-year-old man named K. Rajkumar was taken into custody by Nedumkandam police in a financial crime case on 12 June 2019. On 16 June 2019, he was presented before a magistrate. He died on 21 June 2021 after being tortured in custody.
 23 June 2020: The custodial death of P. Jeyaraj and Bennicks. P. Jeyaraj and his son Bennicks were arrested by Sathankulam police on 19 June 2020 for allegedly keeping their cellphone store open past the Covid-19 lockdown timings. They were tortured in custody. Bennicks died on 22 June 2020 and P. Jeyaraj on 23 June 2020.

See also
 Encounter killings by police
 List of cases of police brutality in India

References

Further reading
 

Extrajudicial killings
Law enforcement in India
Killings by law enforcement officers